Enrique 'Quique' Fornos Domínguez (born 1 January 1997) is a Spanish footballer who plays for Racing Ferrol as a central defender.

Club career
Born in As Pontes, Galicia, Fornos was a youth product of Deportivo de La Coruña. He made his debuts as a senior with the reserves, representing the side in the fourth division.

Fornos made his official debut for the Galicians' first team on 17 August 2013, playing the last 33 minutes in a 2–2 draw against Córdoba CF for the season's Copa del Rey; he also was one of the youngest players to debut with Depor 's first team, with only 16 years old.

On 17 April 2019, Fornos was presented as a new player of Racing Ferrol.

References

External links

1997 births
Living people
Spanish footballers
Footballers from As Pontes de García Rodríguez
Association football defenders
Segunda División B players
Tercera División players
Deportivo Fabril players
Racing de Ferrol footballers
Spain youth international footballers